The Leftist Current (Spanish: Corriente de Izquierda) is a leftist political party within the Broad Front political party which has held power in Uruguay since 2005.

In internal elections within Frente Ampilo, the party got 1.17% of the vote. Despite electoral failings, the Corriente de Izquierda has a very active base of party activists within the capital Montevideo.

Broad Front (Uruguay)
Political party factions in Uruguay
Socialist parties in Uruguay